The 2023 CONCACAF Gold Cup will be the 17th edition of the CONCACAF Gold Cup, the biennial international men's football championship of the North, Central American and Caribbean region organized by CONCACAF. The tournament will take place from June 24 to July 16, 2023. The final will be held at SoFi Stadium in Inglewood, California, a suburb of Los Angeles.

The United States are the defending champions, having won the 2021 edition.

Qualified teams
On September 2, 2020, CONCACAF announced that 2022 FIFA World Cup hosts Qatar would participate in the 2021 and 2023 tournaments. The remaining teams will qualify through the 2022–23 CONCACAF Nations League and the 2023 Gold Cup qualifying tournament:

 The top eight teams in the Nations League A will qualify to the Gold Cup, and the remaining four teams will enter the qualifying tournament.
 The top four teams in the Nations League B will qualify to the Gold Cup, and the next best four teams will enter the qualifying tournament.
 The top four teams in the Nations League C will enter the qualifying tournament.
 The top three teams in the qualifying tournament will qualify to the Gold Cup.

Draw and schedule
The final draw is scheduled to be held on April 14, 2023.

Marketing

Sponsorship
The following were announced as global sponsors of the tournament:
Corona Refresca
Cerveza Modelo de México
Qatar Airways
Volkswagen

References

External links

2023
Gold Cup
Scheduled association football competitions
June 2023 sports events in the United States
July 2023 sports events in the United States